

Country code 
The International Organization for Standardization, ISO, has yet to assign a code to the country. The ISO country code standard 3166 has a couple of unused codes that can be used for user specific elements: “If users need code elements to represent country names not included in this part of ISO 3166, the series of letters AA, QM to QZ, XA to XZ, and ZZ, and the series AAA to AAZ, QMA to QZZ, XAA to XZZ, and ZZA to ZZZ respectively and the series of numbers 900 to 999 are available.”

The European Commission and many other organisations (Deutsche Bundesbank, Switzerland) are using ‘XK‘ as a temporary country code for Kosovo till ISO officially assigns a code. GeoNames will switch to the official ISO code as soon as it has been decided, but is using ‘XK‘ until then.

The US standards body ‘FIPS’ has assigned the country code ‘KV‘ to Kosovo.

Dialing code 
The dialing code for Kosovo is +383 temporary country code XK are 5 digit numeric.

Regional postal codes

External links 

 https://postakosoves.com/en/zip-codes/

Kosovo